Nile J. Dillmore (born September 4, 1947) was a Democratic member of the Kansas House of Representatives, representing the 92nd district.  Born in Neodesha, Kansas, Dillmore served from 2001 until his resignation on September 5, 2013, the day after his 66th birthday. His reason for leaving, he said, was that he "...wanted to look around for some other things to do."

Dillmore, who has his BBA from Wichita State University, currently works as a land/home development specialist and a supervisor of specialized assets at Empire Bank.

He has been active in a number of organizations including Wichita Independent Neighborhoods, Wichita Alternative Correctional Housing Board, the Historic Midtown Citizen Association, Sedgwick County Community Corrections Advisory Board, and SRS Advisory Board of Alcohol and Drug Abuse.

Committee membership
 Taxation
 Corrections and Juvenile Justice
 Financial Institutions
 Insurance (Ranking Member)
 Joint Committee on Information Technology

Major donors
The top 5 donors to Dillmore's 2008 campaign:
 Kansas National Education Assoc 	$1,000 	
 Kansans for Lifesaving Cures 	$1,000 	
 Kansas Credit Union Assoc 	$1,000 		
 Kansas Assoc of Insurance & Financial Advisors 	$650 	
 HSBC North America 	$600

References

External links
 Official Website
 Kansas Legislature - Nile Dillmore
 Project Vote Smart profile
 Kansas Votes profile
 Campaign contributions: 2000, 2002, 2004, 2006, 2008

Democratic Party members of the Kansas House of Representatives
Living people
Wichita State University alumni
1947 births
People from Neodesha, Kansas
21st-century American politicians